Damaged Goods is a 1937 American drama film directed by Phil Goldstone and starring Pedro de Cordoba, Phyllis Barry and Douglas Walton. It is based on the play Les Avariés by Eugène Brieux and the subsequent adapted novel Damaged Goods by Upton Sinclair. A silent film adaptation Damaged Goods had been made in 1914.

The film's sets were designed by the art director Frank Dexter.

Plot
A young lawyer, engaged to the daughter of a Congressman, attends a party where he has a fling with another woman. Two weeks later he suspects that he has contracted syphilis from her.

Cast
 Pedro de Cordoba as Dr. Edward B. Walker
 Phyllis Barry as Margie
 Douglas Walton as George Dupont
 Arletta Duncan as Henrietta Allen
 Ferdinand Munier as Congressman Allen
 Esther Dale as Mrs. Dupont
 Clarence Wilson as Dr. N.R. Shryer
 Greta Meyer as Bertha
 Frank Melton as Jack
 Gretchen Thomas as Woman Patient
 Dorothy Short as Table Dancer

References

Bibliography
 Schaefer, Eric. "Bold! Daring! Shocking! True!": A History of Exploitation Films, 1919-1959. Duke University Press, 1999.

External links
 

1937 films
1937 drama films
American drama films
Films directed by Phil Goldstone
American films based on plays
Grand National Films films
1930s English-language films
1930s American films